Vernon Cheung (born 22 February 1971) is an Australian handball player. He competed in the men's tournament at the 2000 Summer Olympics.

References

External links

1971 births
Living people
Australian male handball players
Olympic handball players of Australia
Handball players at the 2000 Summer Olympics
People from the National Capital District (Papua New Guinea)